Arthur Anderson (1860 – 5 May 1915) was an Australian politician.

He was born in Sydney. In 1913 he was elected to the Tasmanian House of Assembly as a Labor member for Bass. He held the seat until his death in Launceston in 1915.

References

1860 births
1915 deaths
People educated at Launceston Church Grammar School
Australian Labor Party members of the Parliament of Tasmania
Members of the Tasmanian House of Assembly